Lou Brock (August 21, 1892 – April 19, 1971) was an American film producer, screenwriter and director. He produced more than 70 films between 1930 and 1953. He was nominated for two awards at the 6th Academy Awards in 1934 in the category Best Short Subject. His film So This Is Harris won the award. He was born in Kalamazoo, Michigan and died in Los Angeles.

Selected filmography
 Scratch-As-Catch-Can (1931)
 A Preferred List (1933)
 So This Is Harris (1933)
 Behind the Mike (1937)
 Girls' Town (1942)
 The Shadow Returns (1946)
 Train to Alcatraz (1948)

References

External links

1892 births
1971 deaths
American film producers
American male screenwriters
American film directors
Directors of Live Action Short Film Academy Award winners
20th-century American male writers
20th-century American screenwriters